The Protestation may mean:

Protestation of 1621
Protestation of 1641
See also Protestation Returns of 1642